Robert H. Harris (born Robert H. Hurwitz; July 15, 1911 – November 30, 1981) was an  American character actor.

Stage
A veteran of the Yiddish Art Theater from his teens, Harris made his first Broadway appearance in 1937 in Schoolhouse on the Lot. His other Broadway credits include Xmas in Las Vegas (1965), Minor Miracle (1965), Foxy (1963), Look, Ma, I'm Dancin'! (1947) and Brooklyn, U.S.A. (1941).

In 1952, Harris was the managing director of the Woodstock Playhouse in Woodstock, New York. Prior to that, he had directed repertory theater in Boston and Hollywood.

Television 
From 1950 on, he appeared extensively on television series, specializing in playing shady, if not outright evil characters, roles for which he excelled. From 1953–1956 he played Jake Goldberg in The Goldbergs, one of his few sympathetic roles. (His obituary distributed via United Press International says that he played the role of Jake Goldberg in 1953-1954.) In 1957, Harris played the lead role in The Court of Last Resort.

He also made many guest appearances in many other TV series. These include eight appearances in Alfred Hitchcock Presents between 1956 and 1961 and seven appearances in Perry Mason between 1958 and 1965 including in the 1962 episode "The Case of the Dodging Domino". Among his seven appearances, he played the murderer three times, the murder victim once, and the defendant once. He also appeared in other television series such as Peter Gunn, 77 Sunset Strip, Gunsmoke, Ben Casey, The Asphalt Jungle, and  Rawhide.   Robert H. Harris also appeared in the first season of Barnaby Jones; episode titled, "Twenty Million Alibis"(May 6, 1973).

Film 
He starred in the 1958 B-movie horror film How to Make a Monster and had notable appearances as a rich cuckold in Elia Kazan's 1963 film America America, and Edward Dmytryk's 1965 film Mirage, as the obsessive-compulsive consulting psychiatrist. His other film credits included roles in Bundle of Joy (1956), The Invisible Boy (1957), Peyton Place (1957), The George Raft Story (1961), Apache Uprising (1965), Valley of the Dolls (1967), How Awful About Allan (1970), The Great Northfield Minnesota Raid (1972) and The Man in the Glass Booth (1975).

Personal life and death
Harris and his wife, actress Viola Harris, had a son, Steven Lee. Harris died November 30, 1981.

Filmography

Series in detail
Appearances in Alfred Hitchcock Presents
 "Mr. Fox" in episode: Shopping for Death, first broadcast on January 29, 1956 (episode # 1.18).
 "Laurence Appleby" in episode: The Orderly World of Mr. Appleby, first broadcast on April 15, 1956 (episode # 1.29).
 "John Hurley" in episode: The Hidden Thing, first broadcast on May 20, 1956 (episode # 1.34).
 "Albert Birch" in episode: Toby, first broadcast on November 4, 1956 (episode # 2.6).
 "LaFontaine" in episode: The Dangerous People, first broadcast on June 23, 1957 (episode # 2.39).
 "George Piper" in episode: The Safe Place, first broadcast on June 8, 1958 (episode # 3.36).
 "Ben Prowdy" in episode: Graduating Class, first broadcast on December 27, 1959 (episode # 5.14).
 "Morty Lenton" in episode: The Greatest Monster of Them All, first broadcast on February 14, 1961 (episode # 6.18).

Appearances in The Alfred Hitchcock Hour
 "Dr. Perrigan" in episode: Consider Her Ways, first broadcast on December 28, 1964 (episode # 3.11).

Appearance in Voyage to the Bottom of the Sea
 "Dr. Eric Carlton" in episode "The Sky Is Falling (1966)"

Appearances in Perry Mason
 "Edmund Lacey" in episode: The Case of the Lonely Heiress, first broadcast on February 1, 1958 (episode # 1.20).
 "Aaron Hubble" in episode: The Case of "The Purple Woman", first broadcast on December 6, 1958 (episode # 2.9).
 "Gordon Russell" in episode: The Case of the Slandered Submarine, first broadcast on May 14, 1960 (episode # 3.23).
 "Claude Demay" in episode: The Case of the Torrid Tapestry first broadcast on April 22, 1961 (episode # 4.23).
 "Jerry Janda" in episode: The Case of the Dodging Domino first broadcast on November 1, 1962 (episode # 5.8).
 "Harry Bronson" in episode: The Case of the Frustrated Folksinger, first broadcast on January 7, 1965 (episode # 8.15).
 "Marty Webb" in episode: The Case of the Runaway Racer, first broadcast on November 14, 1965 (episode # 9.10).

Appearances in Gunsmoke
 "Ben Pitcher" in episode: Cow Doctor, first broadcast on September 8, 1956  (episode # 2.1).
 "Fred Myers" in episode: Kick Me, first broadcast on January 26, 1957 (episode # 2.18).

Appearances in The Man from U.N.C.L.E.
 "Dr. Janos Hrandy" in episode: The Love Affair, first broadcast on March 29, 1965 (episode # 1.26).
 "Mark Ole" in episode: The Pop Art Affair, first broadcast on October 7, 1966 (episode # 3.6).

Appearances in The Untouchables
  "Phil Corbin" in episode: Kiss of Death Girl, first broadcast on December 8, 1960 (episode # 3.6).

Appearances in Suspense
 episode: Escape This Night, first broadcast on February 7, 1950 (episode # 2.23).
 episode: Dark Shadows, first broadcast on September 19, 1950 (episode # 3.4).
 episode: Night Drive, first broadcast on February 26, 1952 (episode # 4.24).

Appearances in Climax!
 episode: Flight 951, first broadcast on April 21, 1955 (episode # 1.22).
 appearing as Robert Harris playing "Porfear" in episode: No Right to Kill, first broadcast on August 9, 1956 (episode # 2.42).
 episode: The Secret of the Red Room first broadcast on September 12, 1957 (episode # 3.44).

Appearances in Bonanza
 Jacob J. Dormann in episode: "The Legacy", first broadcast on December 15, 1963 (episode # 5.11).

References

 4. Demetria Fulton previewed Robert H. Harris' appearance in the first season of Barnaby Jones; episode titled, "Twenty Million Alibis"(May 6, 1973).

External links

1911 births
1981 deaths
Male actors from New York City
American male film actors
American male television actors
20th-century American male actors
Jewish American male actors
20th-century American Jews